Joiser Daniel Arias Maza (born 3 December 1998) is a Venezuelan footballer who plays as a defender for Aragua F.C. in the Venezuelan Primera División.

Career

Early career
Arias spent much of his youth career with hometown club Caracas. Despite appearing in the matchday squad for the club several times between 2017 and 2018, he never made a first-team appearance for the club.

Aragua
In January 2019, Arias joined Primera División club Aragua. He made his professional debut for the club on 3 February 2019, coming on as a 73rd-minute substitute for Rafael Arace in a 2–1 defeat to Trujillanos. He would score his first professional goal for the club the following season, scoring in the 24th minute of a 2–1 victory over Portuguesa.

Career statistics

Club

References

External links

1998 births
Living people
Aragua FC players
Venezuelan Primera División players
Venezuelan footballers
Association football defenders
21st-century Venezuelan people